Mkhitarashen or Mukhtar is a village de facto in the Askeran Province of the breakaway Republic of Artsakh, de jure in the Khojaly District of Azerbaijan, in the disputed region of Nagorno-Karabakh.

Toponymy 
The village was known as Mkhitarikend during the Soviet period.

History 
During the Soviet period, the village was part of the Askeran District of the Nagorno-Karabakh Autonomous Oblast. The village has been administrated as part of the Askeran Province of the Republic of Artsakh after the First Nagorno-Karabakh War. 

There was some initial confusion regarding control of the village after the 2020 Nagorno-Karabakh war, however, on 1 March 2021, the Armenian news organization CivilNet published a video report from the village, confirming continued Artsakh control.

Historical heritage sites 
Historical heritage sites in and around the village include a 17th/18th-century cemetery and the 19th-century church of Surb Astvatsatsin. A monument in honor of the 18th-century Armenian satirist and fabulist Pele Pughi was built in 1976 between Mkihtarashen and Shosh.

Economy and culture 
The population is mainly engaged in agriculture and animal husbandry. As of 2015, the village has a municipal building, a house of culture, and a medical centre. Students study in the secondary school of the neighboring village of Shosh.

Demographics 
The village has an ethnic Armenian-majority population, had 90 inhabitants in 2005, and 91 inhabitants in 2015.

Gallery

References

External links 

 
 

Populated places in Askeran Province
Populated places in Khojaly District